Krottendorf is a municipality in the district of Weiz in Styria, Austria.

Krottendorf may also refer to:

 Krottendorf-Gaisfeld, a municipality in the district of Voitsberg in Styria, Austria
 Békásmegyer or Krottendorf, a neighbourhood of Budapest, Hungary
 Krottendorf bei Güssing, a Hungarian exonym in Burgenland, Austria
 Krottendorf bei Neuhaus am Klausenbach in Jennersdorf District, Austria

People with the surname
 Ida Krottendorf (1927-1998), Austrian actress

See also 
 Crottendorf, Saxony